Toni Bentley (born 1958) is an Australian-German dancer and writer. Bentley was born in Perth, Western Australia.

Family and early life
Bentley's father, P. J. Bentley, is an Australian biologist and endocrinologist. Her brother, Dr. David Bentley, is a molecular biologist at the University of Colorado Denver. She took her first ballet class at age four in Bristol, England, and entered the School of American Ballet, the official school of New York City Ballet, at age ten. At age seventeen she joined George Balanchine's New York City Ballet where she performed for ten years under his tutelage. She retired from the stage at age 26 owing to a hip injury.

Career
Bentley has written five books. Winter Season, A Dancer's Journal, was published when she was 22 years old by Random House. It is a diary of her life as a corps-de-ballet dancer in the New York City Ballet. It was called "a mini-marvel" by Robert Craft in The New York Review of Books. Her other books include Holding On to the Air: the Autobiography of Suzanne Farrell (co-authored with Farrell, Simon & Schuster, 1990); Costumes by Karinska (Harry N. Abrams, 1995) about Russian costumer designer Barbara Karinska; Sisters of Salome (Yale University Press, 2002), a cultural history of the femme fatale and origins of modern striptease; and The Surrender, An Erotic Memoir (ReganBooks/HarperCollins, 2004). All of her books have been named as Notable Books of the Year by The New York Times. She has written essays and reviews for The New York Times Book Review, Vogue, The New Republic, Bookforum, and CR Fashionbook. Her essay "The Bad Lion", originally published in The New York Review of Books, was selected for The Best American Essays (2010) by editor Christopher Hitchens.

She has given lectures at Harvard University, the Oscar Wilde Society, the Philadelphia Museum of Art, the Zimmerli Art Museum at Rutgers University, the University of North Florida, the Philoctetes Society, and at THiNK 2013. In 2008 she was awarded a Guggenheim Fellowship.

The Surrender
HarperCollins published Bentley's book The Surrender (2004), a memoir of her experiences with heterosexual sodomy and a celebration of female sexual submission. At the time the book caused Bentley considerable notoriety given her perceived status as part of cultured society and the taboo nature of the subject matter. The subject has since received considerable mainstream attention because of the worldwide profile gained by Fifty Shades of Grey. The book has been translated into eighteen languages. A one-woman play adaptation of The Surrender, La Rendición directed by Spanish film director  adapted by Swiss-German actress  had its premiere in Spanish in Madrid at the Microteatro Por Dinero in January 2012. Stoffel starred in the production. It was subsequently produced by the Spanish National Theatre (Centro Dramático Nacional) in January 2013 at the Teatro María Guerrero in Madrid. The play had its English-language world premiere at the Edinburgh Festival Fringe in August 2013, and had its American premiere at the Clurman Theatre in New York City in January 2014. It has also been performed in Buenos Aires, Barcelona, Valencia, and in a German-language version,  in Kiel, Germany, and Bern, Switzerland.

Selected works

Books
 Winter Season: A Dancer's Journal (Random House, 1982)
 Holding On to the Air (Simon & Schuster, 1990)
 Costumes by Karinska (Harry N. Abrams, 1995)
 Sisters of Salome (Yale University Press, 2002)
 The Surrender: An Erotic Memoir (Ecco/HarperCollins, 2004)
 Serenade: A Balanchine Story (Pantheon Books, 2022)

Anthologies
 Remembering Lincoln (editor Nancy Reynolds, The Ballet Society, 2007)
 Reading Dance (editor Robert Gottlieb, Pantheon Books, 2008)
 Dirty Words, A Literary Encyclopedia of Sex (editor Ellen Sussman, Bloomsbury, 2008)
 Best American Essays 2010 (editor Christopher Hitchens, Houghton Mifflin Harcourt, 2010)
 New York Diaries 1609–2009 (editor Teresa Carpenter, Modern Library, 2012)

Reviews

 Upstairs, Downstairs: 'Vagina: A New Biography', by Naomi Wolf
 Vita and Violet: The Greatest Bloomsbury Love Story: 'A Book of Secrets' by Michael Holroyd
 Taking Flight: 'Apollo's Angels, A History of Ballet' by Jennifer Homans
 Meet, Pay, Love: 'Hos, Hookers, Call Girls, and Rent Boys' edited by David Henry Sterry and R. J. Martin Jr
 Appraising Grace: 'Ballet's Magic Kingdom' by Akim Volynsky. Edited and translated by Stanley J. Rabinowitz
 [https://query.nytimes.com/gst/fullpage.html?res=9E07EFDA1739F93AA15756C0A9639C8B63&pagewanted=all A 'Hyena in Petticoats''': 'Vindication, A Life of Mary Wollstonecraft' by Lyndall Gordon]
 Two-Step: ‘The Astaires' by Kathleen Riley
 Faithless Love: 'Jealousy' by Catherine Millet Translated by Helen Stevenson
 Casanova, The Man Who Loved Women: 'Casanova' by Ian Kelly
 The Brando of Ballet: 'Nureyev' by Julie Kavanagh
 Life, and My Evil Ex-Boyfriend: 'Learning to Drive' by Katha Pollitt
 Nip and Tuck: 'Beauty Junkies' by Alex Kuczynski
 The Master: 'George Balanchine: The Ballet Maker' by Robert Gottlieb, 'All in the Dances: A Brief Life of George Balanchine' by Terry Teachout
 'Margot Fonteyn': Leaping Beauty by Meredith Daneman
 The Rage of Joe: Lars von Trier’s 'Nymphomaniac' and the Female Scream by Lars von Trier
 'Zumanity' heralds a burlesque revival 
 A Picture of Passion: 'The Company' by Robert Altman
 Shutters and Shudders: 'Lee Miller, A Life' by Carolyn Burke
 The Girl Can't Help It: 'The Female Thing' by Laura Kipnis
 Bound for Glory: 'Writer of O' by Pola Rapaport
 Sex and the 'Girls' Woman: Lena Dunham 
 Butchery at the Ballet: 'Black Swan'
 I Feel Bad About My Neck: And Other Thoughts on Being a Woman by Nora Ephron

Essays

 The Ghost Hovering Over ‘Giselle’
 Related, by Devotion, to Balanchine
 Dancers: The Agony And The Ecstasy
 Reaching For Perfection – The Life And Death of a Dancer 
 The Bad Lion
 A Ballerina, Inside Out
 Boxers and Ballerinas
 The Ballet That Changed Everything
 Darci Kistler Exits the Stage
 A Chart-Topping Cave Dweller
 The Thin End of the Whip
 The Legend of Henry Paris
 Critic's Argument for Heftier Dancers Is Thin
 The Vagina Fallacy

References

External links
 
 Contributions, The New York Times''

1958 births
Living people
Australian ballerinas
Australian women writers
Australian writers
Writers from Perth, Western Australia